Don't Shove is a 1919 American short comedy film featuring Harold Lloyd. Prints of the film exist at the Library of Congress, the UCLA Film and Television Archive, the Museum of Modern Art, and the Cinémathèque québécoise.

Cast
 Harold Lloyd as Harold
 Bebe Daniels as Bebe
 Bud Jamison as Harold's rival
 Noah Young as Tough guy
 Eddie Boland
 Sammy Brooks as Party Guest
 Lige Conley (as Lige Cromley)
 Wallace Howe (as W. Howe)
 Dee Lampton as Fat Rival
 Marie Mosquini
 Fred C. Newmeyer (as Fred Newmeyer)
 James Parrott
 Snub Pollard
 Gus Leonard as Old man (uncredited)

Plot
Harold arrives as Bebe's birthday party bearing a large gift.  His rival, however, changes the box's contents so that when Bebe opens the box it contains a pipe and a whisky flask.  Upset, she orders Harold to leave the party.  Upon leaving the premises, Harold gets into a prolonged scuffle with another party guest who wants to make sure Harold does leave.  A teenage boy eventually knocks out Harold's pursuer.  Harold asks the boy to teach him boxing basics.  In doing so, Harold accidentally strikes a policeman.  Harold flees from the officer and ends up in a roller rink.  By coincidence, the attendees at Bebe's birthday party visit the same roller rink.  Harold ends up back in Bebe's good graces after he wins a "hurdle race" on roller skates that features numerous obstacles, jumps and ramps.

See also
 List of American films of 1919
 Harold Lloyd filmography

References

External links

1919 films
American silent short films
American black-and-white films
Films directed by Alfred J. Goulding
1919 comedy films
1919 short films
Silent American comedy films
Films with screenplays by H. M. Walker
American comedy short films
1910s American films
1910s English-language films